CS Unirea Tărlungeni was a Romanian football club based originally in Tărlungeni, Brașov County and for a short period in Ștefăneștii de Jos, Ilfov County, which last played in the Liga II.

History
CS Unirea Tărlungeni was founded in 1983 and was assigned to Division C (later Liga III). In 2010, the team was taken over by former player of Unirea Urziceni, László Balint. After 40 seasons in the third echelon in 2013 Tărlungeni Unirea finished the season first in the sixth series of this competition and promoted the first in Liga II.

On 18 September 2013 Unirea Tărlungeni was defeated by former national champion Rapid București, relegated to the second echelon by decision of the Court of Arbitration for Sport in Lausanne for financial reasons and after a barrage of maintaining played with Concordia Chiajna with the score 0 -1, at home in a match counting for the third stage of the second league. It was a first for Tărlungeni football club in the first match being televised encounter a team of Romanian football tradition, with numerous participations in European cups and titles.

In the summer of 2016, Unirea Tărlungeni was moved from Tărlungeni to Ștefăneștii de Jos.

After the move, the team faced financial problems due to non-involvement of Ștefăneștii de Jos Municipality, one of its new owners. During the winter break all the players terminated their contracts and left the team. Despite the efforts to maintain the club, Unirea Tărlungeni withdrew from Liga II in February 2017.

Honours
Liga III
Winners (1): 2012–13
Liga IV – Brașov County
Winners (2): 2005–06, 2006–07
Runners-up (1): 2004–05

League history

References

Football clubs in Brașov County
Football clubs in Ilfov County
Association football clubs established in 1983
Association football clubs disestablished in 2017
Liga II clubs
Liga III clubs
Liga IV clubs
1983 establishments in Romania
2017 disestablishments in Romania